The Europe/Africa Zone was one of the three zones of the regional Davis Cup competition in 2001.

In the Europe/Africa Zone there were four different tiers, called groups, in which teams competed against each other to advance to the upper tier. The top two teams in each Group IV sub-zone advanced to the Europe/Africa Zone Group III in 2002. All other teams remained in Group IV.

Participating nations

Draw
 Venue: Marsa Sports Club, Marsa, Malta
 Date: 9–13 May

Group A

Group B

  and  promoted to Group III in 2002.

Group A

Malta vs. Libya

Andorra vs. Ethiopia

Malta vs. Angola

Libya vs. Ethiopia

Andorra vs. Libya

Angola vs. Ethiopia

Malta vs. Ethiopia

Andorra vs. Angola

Malta vs. Andorra

Angola vs. Libya

Group B

Senegal vs. Mali

Zambia vs. Djibouti

Senegal vs. Zambia

Mali vs. Djibouti

Senegal vs. Djibouti

Zambia vs. Mali

References

External links
Davis Cup official website

Davis Cup Europe/Africa Zone
Europe Africa Zone Group IV